The 10th New York Infantry Regiment was an infantry regiment that served in the Union Army during the American Civil War. It was also known as the McChesney Zouaves or National Guard Zouaves.

Service

The regiment was organized in New York City and was mustered in for a two-year enlistment on November 23, 1861. Some members of the regiment were mustered out on May 7, 1863, while those who reenlisted remained in the regiment until June 30, 1865.

Casualties
The regiment suffered 130 fatalities.

Commanders
Colonel Walter W. McChesney
 Colonel John E. Bendix
 Colonel Joseph Yeamans
 Colonel George F. Hopper

See also
List of New York Civil War regiments

References

Further reading
 Charles W. Cowtan. Services of the Tenth New York volunteers, national Zouaves, in the war of the rebellion. New York, C. H. Ludwig, 1882.

External links
New York State Military Museum and Veterans Research Center - Civil War - 10th Infantry Regiment History, photographs, table of battles and casualties, historical sketch, monument at Gettysburg, Civil War newspaper clippings, battle flag, and regimental flag for the 10th New York Infantry Regiment.
 

Infantry 010
1861 establishments in New York (state)
Military units and formations established in 1861
Military units and formations disestablished in 1865